Luciosoma is a genus of cyprinid fish found in Southeast Asia. There are currently five species in this genus.

Species
 Luciosoma bleekeri Steindachner, 1878 (Shark minnow)
 Luciosoma pellegrinii Popta, 1905
 Luciosoma setigerum (Valenciennes, 1842)
 Luciosoma spilopleura Bleeker, 1855 (Apollo sharkminnow)
 Luciosoma trinema (Bleeker, 1852)

References

External links

Luciosoma spilopleura - Apollo Shark